The Maduru Oya Solar Power Station is a proposed  floating solar photovoltaic power station to be built over  - or 2%, of the Maduru Oya Reservoir. Following the cabinet approval in 2017, the Ministry of Science and Technology has allocated   for obtaining of required equipment and materials for a prototype training project.

On 9 April 2019, the Ministry of Power and Renewable Energy and the Canadian Commercial Corporation signed a memorandum of cooperation for the joint development of the facility, which is expected to complete by November 2019. The power station is also expected to be the first such facility to utilise energy storage in the country.

See also 
 List of power stations in Sri Lanka

References 

Solar power stations in Sri Lanka
Buildings and structures in Ampara District